The 2009 Medibank International Sydney was a tennis tournament played on outdoor hard courts. It was the 117th edition of the event known that year as the Medibank International Sydney, and was part of the ATP World Tour 250 series of the 2009 ATP World Tour, and of the WTA Premier tournaments of the 2009 WTA Tour. Both the men's and the women's events took place at the NSW Tennis Centre in Sydney, Australia, from 11 through 17 January 2009.

The men's singles line up was headlined by Association of Tennis Professionals (ATP) No. 3, reigning Australian Open and Indian Wells Masters champion, recent Tennis Masters Cup winner Novak Djokovic, 2008 Australian Open runner-up, Bangkok and Paris Masters titlist, Sydney doubles defending champion Jo-Wilfried Tsonga, and Madrid Masters finalist, Casablanca, Indianapolis and Bucharest champion Gilles Simon. Other top seeds competing were Buenos Aires and Stockholm champion David Nalbandian, Gstaad and Umag finalist Igor Andreev, Richard Gasquet, Tomáš Berdych, Tommy Robredo and Dmitry Tursunov.

The women's draw was led by Women's Tennis Association (WTA) No. 2, Wimbledon finalist and US Open champion, Bangalore, Miami and Charleston winner Serena Williams, French Open runner-up, Beijing Olympics silver medalist, Berlin, Los Angeles, Montreal and Tokyo titlist Dinara Safina, and Beijing Olympics gold medalist, Dubai and Luxembourg winner Elena Dementieva. Other players present were WTA Tour Championships runner-up, Prague and Guangzhou titlist Vera Zvonareva, French Open semifinalist Svetlana Kuznetsova, Agnieszka Radwańska, Nadia Petrova and Caroline Wozniacki.

Finals

Men's singles

 David Nalbandian defeated  Jarkko Nieminen, 6–3, 6–7(9–11), 6–2
It was Nalbandian's 1st title of the year and 10th overall.

Women's singles

 Elena Dementieva defeated  Dinara Safina, 6–3, 2–6, 6–1
It was Dementieva's 2nd title of the year and 13th of her career.

Men's doubles

 Bob Bryan /  Mike Bryan defeated  Daniel Nestor /  Nenad Zimonjić, 6–1, 7–6(7–3)

Women's doubles

 Hsieh Su-wei /  Peng Shuai defeated  Nathalie Dechy /  Casey Dellacqua, 6–0, 6–1

External links
Official website

 
Medibank International, 2009

cs:Medibank International Sydney 2009 - muži
fr:Tournoi de Sydney 2009 (ATP)